Mohammad Abdur Rahim is a Bangladesh Nationalist Party politician and the former Member of Parliament of Pabna-12.

Career
Rahim was elected to parliament from Pabna-12 as a Bangladesh Nationalist Party candidate in 1979.

References

Bangladesh Nationalist Party politicians
Living people
2nd Jatiya Sangsad members
Year of birth missing (living people)